Ernest-Théodore Hamy (22 June 1842, Boulogne-sur-Mer – 18 November 1908, Paris) was a French anthropologist and ethnologist.

He studied medicine in Paris, earning his doctorate in 1868. Afterwards, he served as a  préparateur under Paul Broca in the laboratory of anthropology at the Ecole pratique des hautes études. In 1872 he became an assistant naturalist at the Muséum national d'histoire naturelle, where he worked closely with Armand de Quatrefages. In 1892 he was appointed professor of anthropology at the Museum.

He was founder and curator of the Musée d'Ethnographie du Trocadéro as well as creator of the Revue d’ethnographie. Also, he was a member of the Société d’Anthropologie de Paris and the Société de géographie.

Selected works 
 Précis de paléontologie humaine (1870).
 Les Origines du musée d'ethnographie (1890).

References

External links 
 IDREF.fr Extensive bibliography
 Matthew R. Goodrum, "Ernest-Théodore Hamy  (1842-1908)," Online Biographical Dictionary of the History of Paleoanthropology, Matthew R. Goodrum general editor  (2015).  Available at https://drive.google.com/file/d/13VdmR3-7R5b5oTleVblKrLsnRuA1Lf2O/view

1842 births
1908 deaths
French anthropologists
French ethnologists
People from Boulogne-sur-Mer